is a professional race car driver born in Tokyo, Japan.

Ishibashi has participated in Japanese GT Series since 1994, winning the 1995 GT2 class championship. Since 1996 he has participated in the GT300 class, driving for Gaikokuya Porsche in recent seasons.

External links

1949 births
Living people
Japanese racing drivers
Super GT drivers
20th-century Japanese people